The Mobile 3D Graphics API, commonly referred to as M3G, is a specification defining an API for writing Java programs that produce 3D computer graphics. It extends the capabilities of the Java ME, a version of the Java platform tailored for embedded devices such as mobile phones and PDAs. The object-oriented interface consists of 30 classes that can be used to draw complex animated three-dimensional scenes. M3G was developed under the Java Community Process as JSR 184.  , the current version of M3G is 1.1, but version 2.0 is in development as JSR 297.

Goals of M3G 

M3G was designed to meet the specific needs of mobile devices, which are constricted in terms of memory, and processing power, and which often lack an FPU and graphics hardware such as a GPU. The API's architecture allows it to be implemented completely inside software or to take advantage of the hardware present on the device.

Immediate and Retained Modes 

M3G provides two ways for developers to draw 3D graphics: immediate mode and retained mode. In immediate mode, graphics commands are issued directly into the graphics pipeline and the rendering engine executes them immediately. When using this method, the developer must write code that specifically tells the rendering engine what to draw for each animation frame. A camera, and set of lights are also associated with the scene, but is not necessarily part of it. In immediate mode it is possible to display single objects, as well as entire scenes (or worlds, with a camera, lights, and background as parts of the scene).

Retained mode always uses a scene graph that links all geometric objects in the 3D world in a tree structure, and also specifies the camera, lights, and background. Higher-level information about each object—such as its geometric structure, position, and appearance—is retained from frame to frame.

Other Features 

The M3G standard also specifies a file format for 3D model data, including animation data format. This allows developers to create content on PCs that can be loaded by M3G on mobile devices.

Further reading 

 Alessio Malizia: Mobile 3D Graphics, Springer, 2006, 
 Kari Pulli, Tomi Aarnio, Ville Miettinen, Kimmo Roimela, Jani Vaarala: Mobile 3D Graphics with OpenGL ES and M3G, Morgan Kaufmann, 2007, 
 Claus Höfele: Mobile 3D Graphics: Learning 3D Graphics with the Java Micro Edition, Thomson Course Technology PTR, 2007, 
 Carlos Morales, David Nelson: Mobile 3D Game Development: From Start to Market, Charles River Media, 2007,

M3G utilities 
 Desktop-M3G – Open source implementation of M3G for Linux and Android
 XMM3G – Open source implementation of M3G for Windows, WinCE, Linux, Android, iOS and Bada
 M3X – XML encoding of the .m3g file format and related open-source tools
 Wizzer Works M3G Viewer – open source toolkit for viewing and manipulating .m3g files
 M3GExport for Maya
 Mascot Capsule M3G Exporter for 3ds Max, Maya, Lightwave, and Softimage|XSI
 M3G Exporter for Milkshape 3D  for MilkShape3D
 Blender Exporter – an open-source M3G exporter for Blender
 Blender Converter – an open-source file level converter for Blender
 M3G Exporter for Metasequoia – an open-source M3G exporter for Metasequoia
 M3G Reader Writer – an open-source C/C++ library for reading/writing .m3g files

External links 

 JSR 184 (Mobile 3D Graphics API for J2ME 1.0, 1.1)
 JSR 184 1.1 Specification (Mobile 3D Graphics API Technical Specification, Version 1.1, June 22 2005)
 JSR 297 (Mobile 3D Graphics API 2.0)
 Getting Started With the Mobile 3D Graphics API for J2ME
 3D graphics for Java mobile devices: Part 1 and Part 2
 JSR 239 (Java Bindings for OpenGL Embedded Subset) – related Java ME graphics specification
 JSR 184 compatible devices (Performance listing of most mobile 3D devices)

3D scenegraph APIs
Application programming interfaces
Computer file formats
Java device platform
Java specification requests